Neo Souli can refer to:
 Neo Souli, Achaea, a village near Patras
 Neo Souli, Serres, a village in the Serres Prefecture